Shivshankar Painkra is a politician from Chhattisgarh. He was elected to the Chhattisgarh Legislative Assembly in 2013 from Pathalgaon, Jashpur as candidate of Bhartiya Janata Party.

Painkra is a graduate in Civil Engineering from National Institute of Technology, Raipur.

References 

Chhattisgarh MLAs 2013–2018
Bharatiya Janata Party politicians from Chhattisgarh
National Institute of Technology, Raipur alumni
Living people
Year of birth missing (living people)